The Statute Law Revision and Civil Procedure Act 1881 (44 & 45 Vict c 59) is an Act of the Parliament of the United Kingdom. The Bill for this Act was the Statute Law Revision and Civil Procedure Bill.

This Act was repealed by section 1(1) of, and Part XI of Schedule 1 to, the Statute Law (Repeals) Act 1989.

Section 2
This section provided that this Act did not extend to Scotland or Ireland.

Section 6
This section was repealed by section 226(1) of, and Schedule 6 to, the Supreme Court of Judicature (Consolidation) Act 1925.

The Crown Office Rules 1906 were made under the authority conferred by this section. As to this section and those rules, see R v Amendt.

Schedule
The Schedule was repealed by section 1 of, and Schedule 1 to, the Statute Law Revision Act 1894.

See also
Statute Law Revision Act

References
Bibliography
Incorporated Council of Law Reporting for England and Wales. The Law Reports. The Public General Statutes, passed in the forty-fourth and forty-fifth years of the Reign of Her Majesty Queen Victoria, 1881. London. 1881. Pages 359 to 365.
"The Statute Law Revision and Civil Procedure Act, 1881". Halsbury's Statutes of England. Second Edition. Butterworth & Co (Publishers) Ltd. Bell Yard, Temple Bar, London. 1950. Volume 24. Page 199.
"The Statute Law Revision and Civil Procedure Act, 1881". Halsbury's Statutes of England. First Edition. Butterworth & Co (Publishers) Ltd. Bell Yard, Temple Bar, London. 1930. Volume 18:  . Page 985.
"Statute Law Revision and Civil Procedure Act, 1881". Chitty's Statutes of Practical Utility. Sixth Edition. Sweet and Maxwell. Stevens and Sons. London. 1912. Volume 3. Title "Crown". Page 726.
John Mounteney Lely. "Statute Law Revision and Civil Procedure Act, 1881". The Statutes of Practical Utility. (Chitty's Statutes). Fifth Edition. Sweet and Maxwell. Stevens and Sons. London. 1895. Volume 6. Title "Judicature". Pages 78 to 86. 1894. Volume 3. Title "Crown". Page 78.
William Paterson (ed). "Statute Law Revision and Civil Procedure Act, 1881". The Practical Statutes of the Session 1881. Horace Cox. Wellington Street, Strand, London. 1883. Pages 231 to 236.
"The Law and the Lawyers" (1881) 72 The Law Times 20, see also pages 231, 235, 248, 256 and 275
"Current Topics" (1881) 25 Solicitors Journal 692, 713 and 882; (1885) 29 Solicitors Journal 749
Charles Burney, Montague Johnstone Muir Mackenzie and Sir Charles Arnold White. Wilson's Practice of the Supreme Court of Judicature. Seventh Edition. Stevens and Sons Limited. Chancery Lane, London. 1888. Pages cxxvi, 75, 101, 277, 317, 429, 509.
Footnotes

United Kingdom Acts of Parliament 1881